Established in honor of the late Harold Keables, every year since 1986, with the exception of 1988–89, Iolani School honors an academic by allowing for them to be the Harold Keables Chair of English. For two weeks, recipients work to aid and supplement students writing abilities, work with faculty, and give a speech in weekly chapel sessions. Introduced in 2018, The Harold Keables Scholars introduces well-versed intellectuals to speak to students about the world of writing and the power vested within it.

Honorees

Harold Keables Chairs of English

Harold Keables Scholars

Notes 
 Listed in order of appearance

References

Secondary education-related lists
Academic awards